Gò Công is a town district (thị xã) of Tiền Giang province in the Mekong Delta region of Vietnam. The town of Gò Công is not to be confused with East Gò Công and West Gò Công Districts ( and ) which also belong to Tiền Giang Province.

The Royal Mausoleums

The Gò Công District has many canals, orchards and fields. It is home to an ancient architectural complex called the Lang Hoang Gia (Royal Mausoleums). The mausoleum complex is located in Long Hung Commune in the district's Gò Công Town near National Highway 50, and about 30 kilometers from the province's Mỹ Tho Town. It is the place where people of the Pham Dang lineage, a clan of mandarins and courtiers famous in the southern region in the 18th and 19th centuries, were buried after they died.

The complex
The mausoleums for the deceased aristocrats were built facing each other on both sides of a road. It covers an area of nearly 3,000 square meters. The complex is surrounded by a wall, 80 centimetres thick and 90 centimetres high. The ancient gate, decorated with immaculate detail, is now covered with sheets of green moss. Two rows of pines form a path to the mausoleums.

Construction
The mausoleums were built by locals and skillful carpenters from Huế in the central region. Therefore, the complex reflects a traditional Huế architectural style. Several kinds of precious wood were used in the construction of the mausoleum, mostly brought in from the then feudal capital of Huế. No nails were used to connect the wooden pillars, rafters or roof beams of the complex. Wooden tablets with sacred oriental animals and flowers are carved into the surface of much of the wood, creating a great solemnity inside the mausoleums, while imposing pillars add a majesty to the complex.

The Grand Duke
It is located on a mound covering more than 800 square meters and according to local residents, the grand duke was buried in a sitting position inside a two-layered coffin.

References

Populated places in Tiền Giang province
Districts of Tiền Giang province
County-level towns in Vietnam